Toth Nunataks is a small group of isolated nunataks located 17 nautical miles (31 km) north-northwest of Mount Coman in Palmer Land. Mapped by United States Geological Survey (USGS) from surveys and U.S. Navy air photos, 1961–67. Named by Advisory Committee on Antarctic Names (US-ACAN) for Stephen R. Toth, glaciologist at Byrd Station, summer 1965–66.

Nunataks of Palmer Land